Melicope haleakalae, Haleakala melicope,  is a species of plant in the family Rutaceae. It is endemic to the Hawaiian Islands. It grows in wet forests.

References

haleakalae
Endemic flora of Hawaii
Biota of Maui
Taxonomy articles created by Polbot

Endangered flora of the United States